"Bahay kubo" is a Tagalog-language folk song from the lowlands of Luzon, Philippines. In 1924, it was included in a collection of Filipino folk songs compiled by Emilia S. Cavan. 

The song is about a bahay kubo ( in English), a house made of bamboo with a roof of nipa leaves, surrounded by different kind of vegetables, and is frequently sung by Filipino school children, the song being as familiar as the "Alphabet Song" and "Twinkle Twinkle Little Star" from the West. Its composition is sometimes erroneously attributed to composer Felipe Padilla de Leon.

In popular culture

Film
On August 5, 1968, Bahay Kubo, Kahit Munti was produced by Sampaguita Pictures starring Rosemarie Sonora, Blanca Gomez and Ike Lozada and was directed by Jose De Villa. The title was based from the lyrics of the folk song. The movie was written by German Moreno

Music
It was interpreted in 1966 by Sylvia La Torre in her album Katuwaan. The folk song was also included in the album Bahaghari of composer Ryan Cayabyab which was sung by Lea Salonga that also includes other Filipino traditional folk songs. It was also performed by the University of the Philippines Madrigal Singers during the 116th anniversary of the First Philippine Republic.

References

Year of song unknown
Nursery rhymes
Philippine folk songs
Songwriter unknown
Tagalog-language songs